This article lists the major power stations located in Yunnan province.

Non-renewable

Coal based

Renewable

Hydroelectric

Conventional

References 

Power stations
Yunnan